Fortuna is the surname of:

 Brian Fortuna (born 1982), American professional ballroom dancer, choreographer and instructor
 Diana Fortuna (born 1956), American businesswoman
 Diego Fortuna (born 1968), Italian retired discus thrower
 Hoji Fortuna (born 1974), Angolan actor
 Javier Fortuna (born 1990), Dominican professional boxer, former WBA Super Featherweight champion
 Jeric Fortuna (born 1991), Philippine Basketball Association player
 Józef Fortuna (born 1952), Polish politician
 Loris Fortuna (1924–1985), Italian left-wing politician
 Maciej Fortuna, Polish trumpet player, composer and musical educator
 Manuel Fortuna (born 1985), Dominican basketball player
 Mario Fortuna (1911–1968), Argentine actor
 Núrio Fortuna (born 1995), Angolan footballer
 Stan Fortuna (born 1957), Catholic priest notable for his evangelical musical contributions
 Wallace Fortuna dos Santos (born 1994), Brazilian footballer
 Wojciech Fortuna (born 1952), Polish ski jumper and Olympic champion